The eleventh season of Danse avec les stars, (the French version of Strictly Come Dancing), premiered in September 2021 on TF1, hosted by Camille Combal.

Things To Know
Jean Baptiste Maunier Lola Dubini and Vaimalama Chaves were originally planned to compete in 2020  but because of COVID-19 Pandemic the show was cancelled and then they get recast that season

Jean Baptiste Maunier was asked to compete on season 6 but refuses

Vaimalama Chaves is the first contestant from the French Polynesia

Bilal Hassani became the first LGBTQ+ contestant to compete he dances with a male partner

Claude Dartois was supposed to do the season but because of his participation to the 20 years All-Stars season of Koh Lanta who was aired at the same schedule he refuses to do it but appears in the audience with Laurent Maistret to cheer Moussa Niang

Participants
{| class="wikitable sortable" style="margin:auto; text-align:center; font-size:95%;" 
|-
!Celebrity
!Known for
!Partner
!Status
|-
| Lââm
| 
| Maxime Dereymez
|style="background-color:#f4c7b8;" | Eliminated 1st
|-
| 
| 
| Joël Luzolo
|style="background-color:#f4c7b8;" | Eliminated 2nd 
|-
| Moussa Niang
| 
| Coralie Licata
|style="background-color:#f4c7b8;" | Eliminated 3rd 
|-
| Jean-Baptiste Maunier
| 
| Inès Vandamme
|style="background-color:#f4c7b8;" | Eliminated 4th 
|-
| Vaimalama Chaves
| 
| Christian Millette
|style="background-color:#f4c7b8;" | Eliminated 5th 
|-
| Wejdene
| 
| Samuel Texier
|style="background-color:#f4c7b8;" | Eliminated 6th 
|-
| Lucie Lucas
| 
| 
|style="background-color:#f4c7b8;" | Eliminated 7th
|-
| 
| 
| Candice Pascal
|style="background-color:#f4c7b8;" | Eliminated 8th
|-
| Dita Von Teese
| 
| Christophe Licata
|style="background-color:#f4c7b8;" | Eliminated 9th
|-
| 
| 
| Adrien Caby
|style="background-color:#f4c7b8;" | Eliminated 10th
|-
| 
| 
| Elsa Bois
|style="background:tan;"| Third Place
|-
| Bilal Hassani
| 
| Jordan Mouillerac
| bgcolor=silver|Runner Up 
|-
| Tayc
| 
| Fauve Hautot
| bgcolor=gold|'Winners  
|-
|}

 Scoring 

Red numbers indicate couples with the lowest score for each week.
Blue numbers indicate couples with the highest score for each week.
Green numbers indicate couples who did not dance their second dance for each week.
 the couple earned immunity, and could not be eliminated
 indicates couples eliminated that week.
 indicates the returning couple who finished in the bottom two.
 indicates the winning couple.
 indicates the runner-up couple.
 indicates the third place couple.

Highest and lowest scoring performances
The best and worst dance performances according to the judges' marks were, out of 40 points (Prime 7 scores are recalculated out of 40):

Couples' Highest and lowest scoring performances
According to the traditional 40-point scale (Prime 7 scores are recalculated out of 40):

 Averages 
This table only counts dances scored on the traditional 40-point scale.

Weekly Scores

 Week 1  Individual judges scores in the chart below (given in parentheses) appeared in this order from left to right: Jean-Paul Gaultier, Denitsa Ikonomova, François Alu, Chris Marques.Running order

Judges' votes to save
Gaultier: Wejdene & Samuel
Ikonomova: Wejdene & Samuel
Alu: Wejdene & Samuel
Marques: Lââm & Maxime

 Week 2  Individual judges scores in the chart below (given in parentheses) appeared in this order from left to right: Jean-Paul Gaultier, Denitsa Ikonomova, François Alu, Chris Marques.Running order

Judges' votes to save
Gaultier: Lola & Joël
Ikonomova: Aurélie & Adrien
Alu: Aurélie & Adrien
Marques: Aurélie & Adrien

 Week 3  Individual judges scores in the chart below (given in parentheses) appeared in this order from left to right: Jean-Paul Gaultier, Denitsa Ikonomova, François Alu, Chris Marques.Running order

Judges' votes to save
Gaultier: Vaimalama & Christian
Ikonomova: Vaimalama & Christian
Alu: Vaimalama & Christian
Marques: Moussa & Coralie

 Week 4  Individual judges scores in the chart below (given in parentheses) appeared in this order from left to right: Jean-Paul Gaultier, Denitsa Ikonomova, François Alu, Chris Marques.The 10 remaining couples are put into 5 duels based on the prime 3 results.
The duels' winners are qualified for prime 5 while losers are in face to face.
Running order

 Week 5  Individual judges scores in the chart below (given in parentheses) appeared in this order from left to right: Jean-Paul Gaultier, Denitsa Ikonomova, François Alu, Chris Marques.The judges have buzzer again, if at least 2 judges buzz a performance, the couples is sent in face to face.
Running order

 Week 6  Individual judges scores in the chart below (given in parentheses) appeared in this order from left to right: Jean-Paul Gaultier, Denitsa Ikonomova, François Alu, Chris Marques.All the couples who got less than 30 points are sent in face to face.
Running order

 Week 7  Individual judges scores in the chart below (given in parentheses) appeared in this order from left to right: Jean-Paul Gaultier, Denitsa Ikonomova, François Alu, Chris Marques, Public.Couples are in 2 group based on prime 6 results:
- Group 1: Lucie & Anthony, Michou & Elsa, Aurélie & Adrien, Gérémy & Candice.
- Group 2: Tayc & Fauve, Dita & Christophe, Bilal & Jordan.
The 2 best score from each group are qualified for prime 8 while others are in face to face.
Running order

 Week 8  Individual judges scores in the chart below (given in parentheses) appeared in this order from left to right: Jean-Paul Gaultier, Denitsa Ikonomova, François Alu, Chris Marques.Dita couldn't dance for this prime so, for her duo with Gérémy & Candice, she & Christophe were replaced by Terence Telle (semi-finalist of the 9th season) & Inès Vandamme
Running order

 Week 9  Individual judges scores in the chart below (given in parentheses) appeared in this order from left to right: Jean-Paul Gaultier, Denitsa Ikonomova, François Alu, Chris Marques.The bottom 2 of the 1st dance are sent in face to face and don't dance their 2nd performance.
The last of the 2nd dance is sent in face to face.
The public choose the results of the face to face
Running order

 Week 10 : Semi final  Individual judges scores in the chart below (given in parentheses) appeared in this order from left to right: Jean-Paul Gaultier, Denitsa Ikonomova, François Alu, Chris Marques.The best of the first dance qualify for the final and don't dance his second dance.
The best of the second dance qualify too.
The public choose the last finalist.

Running order

 Week 11 : Final  Individual judges scores in the chart below (given in parentheses) appeared in this order from left to right: Jean-Paul Gaultier, Denitsa Ikonomova, François Alu, Chris Marques.''

The last of the 1st dance is directly eliminated.

The 2 last dance weren't noted but the judges choose their favorite dance.

For the last dance, all judges (except François Alu) choose Bilal.
Running order

Dance schedule
The celebrities and professional partners danced one of these routines for each corresponding week.
 Week 1: Argentine Tango, Samba, Contemporary dance, Tango, Quickstep, Paso Doble & Cha-Cha-Cha
 Week 2: Argentine Tango, Samba, Cha-Cha-Cha, Waltz, Foxtrot & Paso Doble
 Week 3: Waltz, Rumba, Contemporary dance, Cha-Cha-Cha, Jive, American Smooth, Argentine Tango
 Week 4: American Smooth, Samba, Quickstep, Cha-Cha-Cha, Jive, Rumba, Tango & Argentine Tango
 Week 5: Contemporary dance, Argentine Tango, Cha-Cha-Cha, Rumba, Paso Doble, Jazz Broadway, Quickstep, American Smooth
 Week 6: Waltz, Paso Doble, Salsa, Rumba, Quickstep, American Smooth
 Week 7: Contemporary dance, Argentine Tango, Quickstep, Jive, Rumba
 Week 8: Contemporary dance, Quickstep, American Smooth, Cha-Cha-Cha, Paso Doble, Charleston
 Week 9: Cha-Cha-Cha, American Smooth, Contemporary dance, Samba, Waltz, Jive & Paso Doble
 Week 10: Argentine Tango, Contemporary dance, Foxtrot, Samba, Cha-Cha-Cha & American Smooth
 Week 11: Freestyle, Samba, Waltz, Contemporary dance

Dance Chart

 Highest scoring dance
 Lowest scoring dance
 Danced, but not scored

Around the Show

Host
Camille Combal returns as the host of the show for the third year.

Jury
Chris Marques returns as the only remaining judge from previous seasons. Denitsa Ikonomova, formerly a dancer on the show, replaces Shy'm. Patrick Dupond died in March 2021 and is replaced by a Paris Opera dancer. The fourth judge is iconic fashion designer Jean Paul Gaultier.

Dancers
Professional dancers Katrina Patchett & Christian Millette will not return. Denitsa Ikonomova, a four-time winner, replaces Shy'm who is not returning as judge.

In addition, professional dancer Emmanuelle Berne will not return and Jordan Mouillerac come back after being absent from season 10 and five new dancers will make their debut in this season: Coralie Licata (the wife of the professional dancer Christophe Licata), Adrien Caby, Elsa Bois, Joel Lozulo and Samuel Texier.

Finally, on 17 September, we learned that Christian Millette will finally participate.

Contestants
The cast was revealed on July 6, 2021.

References

Season 11
2021 French television seasons